Noltorp Church is a church in Alingsås, Västergötland, Sweden.
It is partner church, run in collaboration between the Alingsås Assembly and the ETUC Mission Association in Noltorp. The church was built in 1991 and replaced an earlier place of worship which was housed in a wooden villa. The building complex, which was inaugurated in December 1991, has two floors. The altar relief was carved by Eva Spångberg.

References

Churches in Västra Götaland County
20th-century churches in Sweden
Churches completed in 1991
1991 establishments in Sweden
Churches in the Diocese of Skara